Ohu is a Māori word meaning 'communal work group'. Ohu may also refer to:

Õhu, a village in Lääneranna Parish, Pärnu County, in southwestern Estonia
 Ōu Mountains, in Japan
 Ohu University, a private university in Kōriyama, Japan
Bayo Ohu (1964–2009), a Nigerian journalist
Nestor Ohu (born 1962), a politician of the Marquesas Islands
Ohu Ou (born 1992), a Chinese actor and singer
 ohu, the ISO 639-3 code for the Old Hungarian language